Joseph Hamilton Basso (September 5, 1904 – May 13, 1964) was an American novelist and journalist.

Born in New Orleans, Louisiana, Basso worked as reporter for several newspapers in New Orleans, wrote 11 novels, primarily about the South, and was an associate editor at The New Yorker for more than 20 years. His best-known work was the novel The View from Pompey's Head, a story of a New York City attorney who returns to his Southern hometown in the early 1950s to investigate a mystery surrounding a famous writer. The book spent almost a year on the bestseller lists in 1954 and later was adapted into a motion picture.

Awards
His 1959 novel The Light Infantry Ball was a finalist for the 1960 National Book Award. It was a kind of prequel to The View from Pompey's Head, set in the same town, Pompey's Head, South Carolina, during the Civil War era.

Basso died in 1964, at age 59, in Weston, Connecticut.


Bibliography

Novels
 Relics and Angels (1929)
 Cinnamon Seed (1934)
 In Their Own Image (1935)
 Courthouse Square (1936)
 Days Before Lent (1939)
 Wine of the Country (1941)
 Sun in Capricorn (1942)
 The Greenroom (1949)
 The View from Pompey's Head (1954)
 The Light Infantry Ball (1959)
 A Touch of the Dragon (1964)

Nonfiction
 Beauregard: The Great Creole (biography) (1933)
 Mainstream (biographical sketches) (1943)
 The World from Jackson Square: A New Orleans Reader (Introduction; edited by Etolia S. Basso) (1948)
 A Quota of Seaweed: Persons and Places in Brazil, Spain, Honduras, Jamaica, Tahiti, and Samoa (travel sketches) (1960)

Further reading
The Road from Pompey's Head: The Life and Work of Hamilton Basso (1999) by Inez Hollander Lake
"Calder Willingham and Hamilton Basso: Dimly remembered, works that disturb and enlighten", by James Sallis, Boston Herald

References

External links 

 Hamilton Basso Papers. Yale Collection of American Literature, Beinecke Rare Book and Manuscript Library. 

1904 births
1964 deaths
American male novelists
American newspaper journalists
The New Yorker people
Novelists from Louisiana
20th-century American novelists
20th-century American male writers
20th-century American non-fiction writers
American male non-fiction writers
Members of the American Academy of Arts and Letters